The Pyros, previously referred to as the Small Tactical Munition (STM), is a weapon developed by Raytheon, designed to be used by UAVs.

Raytheon successfully conducted flight tests in October 2010, and it may be used to arm the AAI RQ-7 Shadow.
 
It weighs , and originally had a  warhead. On April 18, 2011, Raytheon successfully tested a new  warhead for the weapon.  Though lighter, the new warhead has a significantly improved blast-fragment capability. Designed for low collateral damage, its lethal radius is only , with non-lethal effects extending further but lethality dropping dramatically.

In July 2012, Raytheon claimed the STM could be "months" away from fielding. In early August 2012, Raytheon renamed the munition Pyros and completed the first end-to-end test of the bomb. The test validated the weapon's guidance modes, height-of-burst sensor, electronic safe and arm device, and multi-effects warhead.

On July 18, 2014, Raytheon conducted the first live-fire test of the Pyros. The munition targeted a simulated group of insurgents planting a roadside bomb and used its height-of-burst sensor to detonate several feet above the ground.

References

External links

Pyros - Raytheon.com

Raytheon Company products
Guided bombs of the United States